The pale-yellow robin (Tregellasia capito) is a species of passerine bird in the family Petroicidae. It is endemic to eastern Australia. Its natural habitat is subtropical or tropical moist lowland forests. It is a nondescript bird with grey head and olive upperparts, white throat and yellow underparts. The sexes are similar. Two subspecies are recognised: the smaller nana from North Queensland, and the larger and uncommon nominate race capito from southeast Queensland and northeastern New South Wales. It is insectivorous.

Taxonomy
The pale-yellow robin was first described by ornithologist John Gould in 1854. For many years, it was classified with the other yellow robins in the genus Eopsaltria, on the basis of plumage, nests, and behaviour. Others have placed it with the genus Poecilodryas, due to the similarly plumaged fledglings. However, the closest relatives of both it and the related white-faced robin remain unclear, and are hence placed in their own small genus Tregellasia, originally erected by Gregory Mathews in 1912. Like all Australian robins, it is not closely related to either the European robin or the American robin, but belongs rather to the Corvida parvorder, comprising many tropical and Australian passerines, including pardalotes, fairy-wrens and honeyeaters, as well as crows.

Alternate common names given to the species have been large-headed robin and pale robin.

Subspecies
T. c. capito is the nominate race from rainforests of northeastern New South Wales and southeastern Queensland. Larger than the northern subspecies, it has a paler off-white face and is uncommon within its range.
T. c. nana, described in 1878 as Eopsaltria nana by E.B. Ramsay from a specimen collected in Cardwell, has been called the buff-faced or rufous-lored robin, and is found in rainforest in far north Queensland. It is smaller than the southern subspecies, and its subspecific name nana is Latin for 'dwarf'. It has a pale tan face and a pale orange-brown eye ring, hence its common name. It is fairly abundant within its range.

Description
The male and female pale-yellow robin are similar in plumage. Measuring  and weighing , it is a bird of subdued appearance, with grey head and nape blending into olive-green upperparts, more brownish on the wings and tail. The throat is white, and the lores are off-white in the southern race and buff in the northern race. The breast and belly are yellow. The legs are yellow-orange and the iris dark brown. Juvenile birds are rufous with paler streaks on the head. It can be distinguished from the eastern yellow robin, as the latter bird has black legs and is a little larger.

The pale-yellow robin makes a trilling call when displaying or defending its territory.

Distribution and habitat
Sedentary in its range, the pale-yellow robin is found from Mount Amos to Paluma in North Queensland, and from Cooloola on the Sunshine Coast south to Barrington Tops National Park in New South Wales. It prefers rainforest or dense eucalypt forest, particularly where the lawyer vine grows.

Behaviour
The pale-yellow robin is arboreal and secretive. It is predominantly insectivorous, though may supplement its diet with seeds.

Breeding
It uses the prickly lawyer vine (Calamus muelleri) as nesting material and as a nest site. The nest may be anywhere up to 10 m (30 ft) above the ground, though often much lower. Breeding season is July to December with one, or sometimes two, broods. They are pale green, splotched with brownish marks.

References

External links

pale-yellow robin
Birds of Queensland
Endemic birds of Australia
pale-yellow robin
Articles containing video clips
Taxonomy articles created by Polbot